Marine Corps Installations West (MCI WEST) is the regional authority tasked with providing support and oversight of seven United States Marine Corps installations on the West Coast.

Function

Its functions are implementing policies, developing regional strategies and plans, and prioritizing resources. It also provides services, direction, and oversight through assigned U.S. Marine Corps Installations to support the Operating Forces, tenant commands, and activities—all to keep the Marine Corps ready to be deployed..

Kyle Wetter is the officer in charge of the marksmanship training division with Headquarters and Support Battalion, Marine Corps Installations West, Marine Corps Base Camp Pendleton, and was awarded the Navy and Marine Corps Medal.

Subordinate commands 
Marine Corps Recruit Depot San Diego is also a member of the MCICOM West Command. It is also a TECOM base, similar to 29 Palms and Marine Corps Mountain Warfare Training Center Bridgeport also including:

 Marine Corps Base Camp Pendleton
 Marine Corps Air Station Miramar
 Marine Corps Air Station Yuma
 Marine Corps Air Station Camp Pendleton
 Marine Corps Air Ground Combat Center Twentynine Palms
 Marine Corps Logistics Base Barstow
 Mountain Warfare Training Center

See also

 Marine Corps Installations East
 Marine Corps Installations Pacific
 Marine Corps Installations Command

References

External links
 MCI WEST official website

United States Marine Corps organization